Camilla Filippi (born 13 October 1979) is an Italian film, stage and television actress.

Life and career 
Born in Brescia, Filippi started her career, when she was a teenager, appearing in a series of Barilla commercials. She made her acting debut in 1998, appearing in the television miniseries Costanza alongside Monica Guerritore. In 2001, she made her film debut in the low-budget horror The House of Chicken. 

Also a visual artist, she held several exhibitions, notably at the 2015 Festival dei Due Mondi in Spoleto.

Personal life  
Filippi is married to the film director Lucio Pellegrini. She suffered from bulimia nervosa for about twenty years.

Filmography

Films

Television

References

External links
 
  
  

1979 births
Living people
Actors from Brescia
Italian film actresses
Italian stage actresses
Italian television actresses